Moïse Jacobber, born Jacob Ber (6 March 1786, in Blieskastel – 17 July 1863, in Paris) was a German-born French painter who worked at the Manufacture nationale de Sèvres. He specialized in painting flowers.

Life and works
He studied with Gérard van Spaendonck. From 1823 to 1835, he was a floral painter at the porcelain manufactory in Sèvres. He depicted flowers and fruits in several media, including oils, watercolors and porcelain. He was a frequent exhibitor at the Salon from 1822 to 1855; also holding exhibitions in Lille, Douai, Cambrai and London. He signed his works with a variation of his original name, "Jacob-Ber". Some of his porcelain work was based on paintings by Spaendonck and Jan van Huysum.

Among his major works were two large vases in Sèvres porcelain, which were a gift from King Louis Philippe to Leopold, Grand Duke of Baden in 1833.

Most of his work may be seen at the Cité de la céramique, a museum in Sèvres. Notable oil paintings are in the Louvre and the Musée des Beaux-Arts de Rouen.

His daughter, Élisabeth Sidonie Jaccober (married name Worms), also worked as a floral painter in Sèvres from 1835 to 1839 and, in 1840, obtained a lithographic patent to print her own designs.

References

Further reading 
 Xavier Roger Marie Chavagnac and Gaston Antoine de Grollier, Histoire des manufactures françaises de porcelaine, A. Picard et fils, 1906 Online @ Smithsonian Libraries
 Georges Lechevallier-Chevignard, La manufacture de porcelaine de Sèvres, Librairie Renouard, 1908 Online @ Smithsonian Libraries
 Diederik Bakhuÿs and Adeline Collange, Moïse Jacobber, Œuvres provenant du don de Cornélia Scheffer, 1897 (exhibition catalog), Musée des beaux-arts de Rouen, 2007

External links 

 More works by Jacobber @ ArtNet

1786 births
1863 deaths
19th-century French painters
Porcelain painters
Flower paintings
German emigrants to France
Jewish painters